Penny Alison (born 10 August 1983) is a South African sailor. She competed in the Yngling event at the 2008 Summer Olympics.

References

External links
 

1983 births
Living people
South African female sailors (sport)
Olympic sailors of South Africa
Sailors at the 2008 Summer Olympics – Yngling
Sportspeople from Durban